Heike Brandt (born 1947) is a German writer and translator of books for children, who has translated over 70 books from English to German.

Life
Heike Brandt was born in Jever and grew up in Berlin. She lives in Berlin-Kreuzberg.

Aside from translation, her first book was a biography of the feminist and writer Hedwig Dohm. After Brandt had translated several children's books by Elizabeth Honey, the pair directly collaborated to write To the boy in Berlin (2007).

Works

Translations
 Lasst den Kreis geschlossen: Roman by Mildred D. Taylor. Translated from the American Let the Circle Be Unbroken. Weinheim: Beltz & Gelberg, 1987.
 (tr.) Andis Krieg by Billi Rosen. 1990.
 (tr.) Überlebt: als Kind in deutschen Konzentrationslagen [Survived: As a child in a German concentration camp] by Agnes Sassoon. Translated from the English Agnes: how my spirit survived. 1992.
 (tr.) Liebe Tracey, liebe Mandy [Dear Tracey, love Mandy] by John Marsden. 1996.
 (tr.) Salamander im Netz by Elizabeth Honey. 2003.
 (tr.) Monsterwochen [Monster weeks] by Ron Koertge. Translated from the English Stoner and Spaz. Hamburg: Carlsen, 2004.

Other
 Die Menschenrechte haben kein Geschlecht: die Lebensgeschichte der Hedwig Dohm [Human rights have no sex: the life story of Hedwig Dohm], Weinheim: Beltz & Gelberg, 1989.
 Katzensprünge: Roman [Cat leaps: a novel], 1995
 Wie ein Vogel im Käfig: Roman [Like a bird in a cage: a novel]. Weinheim: Beltz & Gelberg, 2003
 (with Elizabeth Honey) To the boy in Berlin, Crows Nest, New South Wales: Allen & Unwin, 2007

References

External links

1947 births
Living people
German children's writers
German women children's writers
German translators
English–German translators
20th-century German women writers
21st-century German women writers